Hugh Lloyd  was a 17th-century English priest.

Lloyd was educated at Jesus College, Oxford. He was archdeacon of Worcester from 1623 to 1629.

References

Alumni of Jesus College, Oxford
Archdeacons of Worcester
17th-century English Anglican priests